William Mountfort was an actor and writer.

William Mountfort may also refer to:

William de Mountfort
William Mountfort (MP) (died 1452), MP for Warwickshire 8 times between 1410 and 1450

See also
William Mountford